Vacek (feminine Vacková) is a Czech surname, also found in Slovakia. It is derived from the name "Václav" (in Latin, Wenceslaus), being a diminutive or nickname thereof, or denoting "son of Václav". Notable people include:

 Dan Vacek, American cannabis rights activist
 Daniel Vacek, Czech tennis player
 Edward Collins Vacek, SJ and professor of Catholic Studies at Loyola New Orleans
 Jan Vacek, Czech tennis player
 Jaroslav Vacek, Czech linguist
 Jiří Vacek, Czech mystic, writer and translator of spiritual literature
 Josef Vacek, Czech politician
 Kamil Vacek, Czech footballer
 Karel Vacek, Czech cyclist
 Růžena Vacková, Czech art historian

There are many variants or derivatives of this surname:
Watzek - a Germanized spelling.
Watzke - a Germanized derivation, dating back to the late Middle Ages. Other spellings such as   Watsky, Watzky, Watski have been noted in various countries.
Vacke - a re-Czechized or Slovacized spelling of Watzke.
Watzka - a Germanized derivation, of some antiquity.
Vacka - a re-Czechized or Slovacized spelling of Watzka.
Watz - an aristocratic Austrian arms-bearing family, believed to be derived from Vacek/Watzek.
Wacke - a spelling found in Poland; it is also the archaic Czech spelling.
Wacyk/Vacyk - a Ukrainianized spelling found in Galicia.
Watsko/Watzko - a Ukrainian (Galician) derivative.

References

Czech-language surnames